Miqan Wetland is a wetland located in Markazi province, Iran. In years with good rainfall, the wetland has significant water level and in the years with less rain, the surface of the wetland generally dries and becomes a desert. The height of the wetland is 1700 meters above sea level and the water inside of it varies in different seasons. Miqan is supplied from different water sources such as rainfall, water of three rivers known as Qarah Kahriz (Koohrood) River, Farahan River, Shahrab River, and Arak ‘s wastewater treatment sewage. The area of the wetland is about 25,000 hectares, which includes a lake with three islands in the middle and the surrounding plains. Archaeologically, the wetland's formation dates back to the Paleocene, which was due to the movement of the surrounding tectonic plates of the earth.

The Miqan Wetland has special ecological features, including the fact that it hosts a large number of migratory birds each year, among which some rare and protected species can be seen. This wetland has become one of the most important environments in the country due to the high population of Gruidaes (Grus). The vegetation of the region is more of saline plants or halophytes, which makes the wetland an important resource of halophytes in the country. In addition to birds, mammal species, artemia (brine shrimps), and saltwater algae are other living things in the wetland and its surroundings.

Name root 
The word Miqan literally means believing. In the past, the wetland was named as "Namakzar Farahan."  This wetland is also called "Miqan Desert" due to its high evaporation of water. However, the name “desert” does not mean “desert” in Farsi, it is a word used instead of “playa.

Location 

Miqan Wetland with an area of 25,000 hectares. The area of Miqan wetland has reached 61.18 square kilometers in May 2019 and more than 19 square kilometers in August 2019. is located 15 km northeast of Arak city and in the south of Davoodabad city. It is next to Rahzan, Deh Namak, and Miqan villages. The catchment area of the wetland varies between 10,000 -12,000 hectares depending on the amount of the absorbed water. Its average altitude is 1700 meters above sea level and its annual rainfall is 258 mm. The water level of the wetland (in different seasons of the year) reaches to 140 cm.

Miqan Wetland is consisted of a seasonal lake, desert, and alluvial plains. The nearest mountain to the wetland is located 10 km southeast of it, which is called "Kooh Takht Zard" with the height of 2269 meters. There are three islands in the middle of the wetland, the largest of which is 500 meters. Miqan Wetland is located at the flattest section of Farahan plain and the region of Arak.

History 
Miqan Wetland is one of the last ecological plains in Arak. All of the region's water pours into it.

In terms of tectonics, the wetland has two large mountainous sides and a sedimentary plain in the middle. The wetland looks like a valley that has sunk along two faults.

According to experts, the wetland is estimated to be 2000 years old. The history of the formation of the region dates back to the Paleocene.

Water supply 
Most of the water entering the wetland is due to rainfall, the surrounding springs, and the seasonal rivers of the region such as Farahan, Shahrab, and Qara Kahriz rivers. In the recent years, the entry of sewage effluent in the city of Arak at the rate of 700 liters per second has been another source of water supply in the wetland, which has affected the region's ecosystem. The level of groundwater aquifers of the wetland has decreased by 13 meters, which doubles the risk of groundwater salinization and secondary environmental damage.

Climate 
The climate of the wetland is hot, dry, and Mediterranean. Its annual rainfall is 354 mm, and its annual evaporation is four times more than the rainfall. The wetland has a high annual temperature difference and sometimes reaches to 69 degrees Celsius. Indiscriminate human intervention in the last 27 years has caused the temperature of the wetland to rise by one degree.

Due to the location of the city near the wetland, water vapor rising from the surface of the wetland softens the air, increases steam and fog, and has a positive effect on reducing the transfer of fine dust. Therefore, in the winter all flights from the airport which is located near the city are cancelled.

Natural features 
Miqan Wetland is a vulnerable environment because of its size, ecological features, and the extent of its impact on the climate of the region and the city of Arak. In 2008 it became a no-hunting area due to the fragile ecosystem. However, since it has valuable and unique environmental features, Miqan Wetland has the necessary characteristics to join to the Ramsar Convention as an international wetlands as well as the protected area of migratory birds and to be registered as national natural areas.

References 

Wetlands of Iran